Sir Richard Levinge, 2nd Baronet ( – 27 February 1748) was an Irish landowner and politician.

He was the eldest son of Sir Richard Levinge, 1st Baronet and his first wife Mary Corbin, daughter of Gawan Corbin, merchant of London. His father, a Derbyshire  man, had a remarkably successful career in Ireland as MP, Privy Councillor, Solicitor General for Ireland, Attorney General for Ireland and Chief Justice of the Irish Common Pleas. On his father's death, he inherited Parwich Hall, the ancestral home in Derbyshire, and the newer property of Knockdrin Castle, County Westmeath. He spent most of his time at Parwich, which he extensively rebuilt.

He married in 1718 Isabella Rawdon (died 1731), daughter of Sir Arthur Rawdon, 2nd Baronet and Helena Graham; her brother John married Richard's sister Dorothy. They had no issue and on his death, his title and estates passed to his brother Charles.

He sat in the House of Commons of Ireland from 1723 to 1727 as a member for Westmeath, and then from 1727 to 1748  as a member for Blessington.

References 

1685 births
Year of birth uncertain
1748 deaths
People from County Westmeath
Baronets in the Baronetage of Ireland
Irish MPs 1715–1727
Irish MPs 1727–1760
Members of the Parliament of Ireland (pre-1801) for County Westmeath constituencies
Members of the Parliament of Ireland (pre-1801) for County Wicklow constituencies